Mary Louise Woodvine (born 14 July 1967) is a British television actress who appeared as Mary Harkinson in the BBC soap EastEnders in 2003. Her father is the actor John Woodvine.

Life and career
Woodvine was born in Queen Charlotte's Hospital, Hammersmith, London. She trained at the Royal Welsh College of Music & Drama and was a core member of Kneehigh Theatre. She has performed in Doc Martin, Born and Bred, Doctors, Noah's Ark, Our Friends in the North, Casualty, The Jury, Pie in the Sky, Grafters, Wycliffe, Down to Earth, Heartbeat and Murder City. In 1994, she played Aurelia Took in the science-fiction drama TV series Space Precinct. She also appeared as Miss Lamplighter in The Worst Witch (1998–2001), from 2005 to 2006, as Judge Morag Hughes in five episodes of Judge John Deed, and she also appears as Mrs. Teague in the 2015 TV series of Poldark.

In 2003, she starred as Evangeline Blight in the Cornish-language short film Blight, co-starring Richard Coyle. Woodvine starred in the award-winning 2007 psychological thriller film The Lark which premièred at the Cambridge Film Festival.

Woodvine, along with Rory Wilton, Jerome Wright and Kirsty Osmon, developed poet Murray Lachlan Young's first play, The Incomers, during a residency at The Space, Dartington Hall Trust. Woodvine created the role of Celia through a series of workshops and in the production's inaugural tour, which ran from April to May 2013.

Woodvine starred in the 2019 film Bait, a drama film written and directed by her partner Mark Jenkin and in 2022 played the lead role in his folllow up Enys Men.

References

External links

1967 births
20th-century British actresses
21st-century British actresses
Actresses from London
People from Hammersmith
British film actresses
British soap opera actresses
British stage actresses
British television actresses
Living people
Alumni of the Royal Welsh College of Music & Drama
20th-century English women
20th-century English people
21st-century English women
21st-century English people